Casey's Birthday is a 1914 American silent comedy film featuring Oliver Hardy.

Plot summary
Daniel Casey refuses to work because it is his birthday: he quits his job and starts off to celebrate. Mrs. Casey has prepared a surprise party and to make sure that Casey will come home sober, she sends his friend, Dooley, out to get him. After visiting a number of saloons, Dooley finally finds Casey very drunk. Dooley gets him partly sober and then starts him for the Casey home. The guests arrive and plan to surprise Casey by turning down the lights. Dooley leads Casey into the house, the lights are suddenly turned up, and at first Casey mistakes them for burglars and starts to fight. He is quieted and all proceed to make merry. Mrs. Krausemier, who has the rooms over Casey's, thinks there is a riot, and she telephones for the police. While the Irishmen are having a good time, the police arrive and attempt to stop the noise, but the Irishmen throw them out of the window. The reserves are called out and another attempt is made to break up the party, but Casey tosses a keg of beer to the police, and they forget all about duty. The guests are called to eat. Mrs. Casey has baked a cake which bears the inscription, "Papa." One of the Irishmen for a joke removes the letter "P," leaving "APA." Casey sees this, goes wild, cleans up the party and chases the guests. Monarch of all he surveys, Casey takes the floor for a bed, wraps himself in a rug, and falls asleep.

Cast
 Charles Barney as Daniel Casey
 Mae Hotely as Mrs. Casey
 Billy Bowers as Mike Dooley
 Oliver Hardy as A Policeman (as Babe Hardy)

See also
 List of American films of 1914
 Oliver Hardy filmography

References

External links

1914 films
1910s English-language films
American silent short films
American black-and-white films
1914 comedy films
1914 short films
Films directed by Arthur Hotaling
Silent American comedy films
American comedy short films
1910s American films